Eric Archibald McNair VC (16 June 1894 – 12 August 1918) was a British soldier. He was a recipient of the Victoria Cross, the highest and most prestigious award for gallantry in the face of the enemy that can be awarded to British and Commonwealth forces.

Biography 
He was educated at Charterhouse School from 1907 to 1913, where he was Head of the School. He then went to Magdalen College, Oxford to study classics, though he left his studies shortly after matriculating to join the forces. While at Oxford he joined the Apollo University Lodge.

He was 21 years old, and a Temporary Lieutenant in the 9th (S) Battalion, Royal Sussex Regiment, British Army during the First World War when the following deed took place for which he was awarded the VC.

On 14 February 1916 near Hooge, Belgium, when the enemy exploded a mine, Lieutenant McNair and a number of men were flung into the air and many were buried. Although much shaken, the lieutenant at once organised a party with a machine-gun to man the near edge of the crater and opened rapid fire on the enemy who were advancing. They were driven back with many dead. Lieutenant McNair then ran back for reinforcements, but the communication trench being blocked he went across the open under heavy fire and led up the reinforcements the same way. His prompt and plucky action undoubtedly saved a critical situation.

He later achieved the rank of Captain.  He died of chronic dysentery at the base hospital in Genoa, Italy, on 12 August 1918.

His Victoria Cross is displayed at the Eastbourne Redoubt Museum, Eastbourne, Sussex, England.

References

External links
Redoubt Fortress Museum 
Eastbourne Redoubt
The Royal Sussex Living History Group Website

1894 births
1918 deaths
People educated at Charterhouse School
Royal Sussex Regiment officers
British Army personnel of World War I
British World War I recipients of the Victoria Cross
British military personnel killed in World War I
Deaths from dysentery
Infectious disease deaths in Liguria
British Army recipients of the Victoria Cross
Freemasons of the United Grand Lodge of England
British people in colonial India